Megaelosia goeldii, also known as the Rio big-tooth frog, is a species of frog in the family Hylodidae. It is the only member of the genus Megaelosia. It is endemic to Southeast Brazil and occurs in São Paulo and Rio de Janeiro states. It is named after Émil Goeldi, a Swiss zoologist who worked in Brazil.

Taxonomy 
The genus Megaelosia formerly contained several other species, but all of these were reclassified in a new genus, Phantasmarana, in 2021 based on a phylogenetic study, leaving M. goeldii as the only remaining member of Megaelosia.

Description
Males measure  and females  in snout–vent length (based on 2 males and 3 females only). The dorsolateral skin is granular. The snout is subacuminate in dorsal view and protruding in profile. The canthus rostralis is evident and straight. Males have neither vocal sacs nor vocal slits.

Diet
Stomach contents have been found to contain insects (cockroaches, Coleoptera, lepidopteran caterpillars), earthworms, and plant material. In experiments, Megaelosia goeldii have consumed other frogs.

Habitat and conservation
Its natural habitats are rivers in primary forest. During the day, they can be found on emergent rocks in shallow places. Tadpoles have been collected under large rocks in a moderate-sized forest stream.

Megaelosia goeldii  is a common species, but very difficult to catch. It is threatened by habitat loss caused by forest clearance and infrastructure development, and by pollution.

References

Hylodidae
Endemic fauna of Brazil
Amphibians of Brazil
Taxonomy articles created by Polbot
Taxa named by Alípio de Miranda-Ribeiro
Monotypic amphibian genera